The Real Housewives of Vancouver was a Canadian reality television show that aired on the Slice cable network. It chronicles the lives of Six women — Jody Claman, Ronnie Negus, Mary Zilba, Amanda Hansen, Ioulia Reynolds, and Robin Reichman  — in and around Vancouver as they socialize, work on their careers and spend time with their families.

Series overview

Episodes

Season 1 (2012)

Season 2 (2013)

References

External links 
 List of The Real Housewives of Vancouver episodes at TV Guide

Lists of Canadian television series episodes
Lists of reality television series episodes
Vancouver episodes